A lemming is a small rodent, usually found in or near the Arctic in tundra biomes. Lemmings form the subfamily Arvicolinae (also known as Microtinae) together with voles and muskrats, which form part of the superfamily Muroidea, which also includes rats, mice, hamsters, and gerbils. In popular culture, a longstanding myth holds that they exhibit herd mentality and jump off cliffs, committing mass suicide.

Description and habitat 
Lemmings are quite rounded in shape, with brown and black, long, soft fur. They have a very short tail, a stubby, hairy snout, short legs, and small ears. They have a flattened claw on the first digit of their front feet, which helps them to dig in the snow. They are herbivorous, feeding mostly on mosses and grasses. They also forage through the snow surface to find berries, leaves, shoots, roots, bulbs, and lichens.
Lemmings choose their preferred dietary vegetation disproportionately to its occurrence in their habitat. They digest grasses and sedges less effectively than related voles.
Like other rodents, their incisors grow continuously, allowing them to feed on much tougher forage.
Lemmings do not hibernate through the harsh northern winter. They remain active, finding food by burrowing through the snow. These rodents live in large tunnel systems beneath the snow in winter, which protect them from predators. Their burrows have rest areas, toilet areas, and nesting rooms. They make nests out of grasses, feathers, and muskox wool (qiviut). In the spring, they move to higher ground, where they live on mountain heaths or in forests, continuously breeding before returning in autumn to the tundra.

Behaviour 
Like many other rodents, lemmings have periodic population booms and then disperse in all directions, seeking food and shelter their natural habitats cannot provide. The Norway lemming and brown lemming are two of the few vertebrates which reproduce so quickly that their population fluctuations are chaotic, rather than following linear growth to a carrying capacity or regular oscillations. Why lemming populations fluctuate with such great variance roughly every four years, before numbers drop to near extinction, is not known.  Lemming behaviour and appearance are markedly different from those of other rodents, which are inconspicuously coloured and try to conceal themselves from their predators. Lemmings, by contrast, are conspicuously coloured and behave aggressively toward predators and even human observers. The lemming defence system is thought to be based on aposematism (warning display). Fluctuations in the lemming population affect the behaviour of predators, and may fuel irruptions of birds of prey such as snowy owls to areas further south.
For many years, the population of lemmings was believed to change with the population cycle, but now some evidence suggests their predators' populations, particularly those of the stoat, may be more closely involved in changing the lemming population.

Misconceptions 
Misconceptions about lemmings go back many centuries. In the 1530s, geographer Zeigler of Strasbourg proposed the theory that the creatures fell out of the sky during stormy weather and then died suddenly when the grass grew in spring. This description was contradicted by natural historian Ole Worm, who accepted that lemmings could fall out of the sky, but claimed that they had been brought over by the wind rather than created by spontaneous generation. Worm published dissections of a lemming, which showed that they are anatomically similar to most other rodents such as voles and hamsters, and the work of Carl Linnaeus proved that they had a natural origin.

Lemmings have become the subject of a widely popular misconception that they are driven to commit mass suicide when they migrate by jumping off cliffs.  It is not a deliberate mass suicide, in which animals voluntarily choose to die, but rather a result of their migratory behavior. Driven by strong biological urges, some species of lemmings may migrate in large groups when population density becomes too great. They can swim and may choose to cross a body of water in search of a new habitat. In such cases, many drown if the body of water is an ocean or is so wide as to exceed their physical capabilities. Thus, the unexplained fluctuations in the population of Norwegian lemmings, and perhaps a small amount of semantic confusion (suicide not being limited to voluntary deliberation, but also the result of foolishness), helped give rise to the popular stereotype of the suicidal lemmings, particularly after this behaviour was staged in the Walt Disney documentary White Wilderness in 1958. The misconception itself is much older, dating back to at least the late 19th century. In the August 1877 issue of Popular Science Monthly, apparently suicidal lemmings are presumed to be swimming the Atlantic Ocean in search of the submerged continent of Lemuria.

Another myth may have roots in the fiercely aggressive nature of lemmings during population booms, and the corresponding leftovers of predatory frenzies: lemmings do not explode.

Classification 
 Order Rodentia
 Superfamily Muroidea
 Family Cricetidae
 Subfamily Arvicolinae: voles, lemmings, and related species
 Tribe Dicrostonychini
 Dicrostonyx
 Northern collared lemming (D. groenlandicus)
 Ungava collared lemming (D. hudsonius)
 Nelson's collared lemming (D. nelsoni)
 Ogilvie Mountains collared lemming (D. nunatakensis)
 Richardson's collared lemming (D. richardsoni)
 Arctic lemming (D. torquatus)
 Unalaska collared lemming (D. unalascensis)
 Tribe Lemmini
 Lemmus
 Amur lemming (L. amurensis)
 Norway lemming (L. lemmus)
 Beringian lemming (L. nigripes)
East Siberian lemming (L. paulus)
West Siberian lemming (L. sibiricus)
 North American brown lemming (L. trimucronatus)
 Myopus
 Wood lemming (M. schisticolor)
 Synaptomys
 Northern bog lemming (S. borealis)
 Southern bog lemming (S. cooperi)
 Tribe Lagurini
Eolagurus
 Yellow steppe lemming (E. luteus)
 Przewalski's steppe lemming (E. przewalskii)
 Lagurus
 Steppe lemming (L. lagurus)

In popular culture and media
The misconception of lemming "mass suicide" is long-standing and has been popularized by a number of factors.

It was well enough known to be mentioned in "The Marching Morons", a 1951 short story by Cyril M. Kornbluth.

In 1955, Disney Studio illustrator Carl Barks drew an Uncle Scrooge adventure comic with the title "The Lemming with the Locket". This comic, which was inspired by a 1953 American Mercury article, showed massive numbers of lemmings jumping over Norwegian cliffs.

Lemmings also appear in Arthur C. Clarke's 1953 short story "The Possessed", where their suicidal urges are attributed to the lingering consciousness of an alien group mind, which had inhabited the species in the prehistoric past.

Perhaps the most influential and, for the lemmings involved, tragic, presentation of the myth was the 1958 Disney film White Wilderness which won an Academy Award for Documentary Feature and in which producers threw lemmings off a cliff to their deaths to fake footage of a "mass suicide", as well as faked scenes of mass migration. A Canadian Broadcasting Corporation documentary, Cruel Camera, found the lemmings used for White Wilderness were flown from Hudson Bay to Calgary, Alberta, Canada, where, far from "casting themselves bodily out into space" (as the film's narrator states), they were, in fact, dumped off the cliff by the camera crew from a truck. Because of the limited number of lemmings at their disposal, which in any case were the wrong subspecies, the migration scenes were simulated using tight camera angles and a large, snow-covered turntable. 

The song "Lemmings (Including 'Cog')" from the 1971 album Pawn Hearts by progressive rock band Van der Graaf Generator is about a person who sees their loved ones "crashing on quite blindly to the sea".

The 1983 song Synchronicity II by The Police makes an allusion to the supposed suicidal tendencies of lemmings in its reference to commuters "packed like lemmings into shiny metal boxes, contestants in a suicidal race."

In 1991, a puzzle-platform video game called Lemmings was released, in which the player must save a certain percentage of the titular small humanoid creatures as they march heedlessly through a dangerous environment. The game became quite popular and has been through several versions up to the present day.

In 2006, the German Fun Metal, Comedy Rock, and Neue Deutsche Härte band Knorkator produced the comedy rock song Wir werden alle sterben (Eng.: We are all going to die). The lyrics state that all signs indicate that we are all going to die soon, possibly even today. Also a child sings some parts stating that this might also happen during brushing teeth, making it more funny but dark. The lyrics do not mention any lemmings, but the music video (available freely on YouTube) shows some creatures which are clearly supposed to be lemmings dying in different situations. The video starts with the typical visualization of these lemmings lining up walking to and over a cliff (which, while falling to their deaths, happily sing about the party coming to an end).

Lemmings are main characters of the 2016 French animated television series Grizzy and the Lemmings. As a humorous allusion to the popular myth, the series frequently features lemmings jumping down from elevated platforms.

In the animated Disney film Zootopia (2016) lemmings are employed as investment bankers of Lemmings Brothers. They are exceptionally prone to herd instinct, including mass suicide.

References

External links 

  Article by Nils Christian Stenseth on the population cycles of lemmings and other northern rodents.
  Article about Collared Lemming, see also the main page on Alaskan mammals.
 Rebuttal of lemming suicide:
 Alaska Wildlife News.
 Lemmings, dying on camera (via Wayback Machine).

Arctic land animals
Mammal common names
Mammals of Greenland
Urban legends